Vineet Kumar Sharma (born 6 January 1959) is an Indian field hockey player. He competed at the 1984 Summer Olympics in Los Angeles, where the Indian team placed fifth.

References

External links

1959 births
Living people
Olympic field hockey players of India
Indian male field hockey players
Field hockey players at the 1984 Summer Olympics
Asian Games medalists in field hockey
Field hockey players at the 1982 Asian Games
Field hockey players at the 1986 Asian Games
Asian Games silver medalists for India
Asian Games bronze medalists for India
Medalists at the 1982 Asian Games
Medalists at the 1986 Asian Games